The 2020–21 Niagara Purple Eagles men's basketball team represented Niagara University in the 2020–21 NCAA Division I men's basketball season. The Purple Eagles, led by second-year head coach Greg Paulus, played their home games at the Gallagher Center in Lewiston, New York as members of the Metro Atlantic Athletic Conference. They finished the season 9–11, 7–9 in MAAC play to finish in a tie for fifth place. As the No. 5 seed in the MAAC tournament, they defeated No. 4 seed Marist in the quarterfinals, but lost to No. 9 seed Iona 64–70 in the semifinals.

Previous season
The Purple Eagles finished the 2019–20 season 12–20 overall, 9–11 in MAAC play to finish in a tie for sixth place. As the #6 seed in the MAAC tournament, they defeated #11 seed Marist 56–54 in the first round. Before they could face #3 seeded Rider in the MAAC tournament quarterfinals, all postseason tournaments were cancelled amid the COVID-19 pandemic.

Roster

Schedule and results 

|-
!colspan=12 style=| Regular season

|-
!colspan=12 style=| MAAC tournament
|-

|-

Sources

References

Niagara Purple Eagles men's basketball seasons
Niagara Purple Eagles
Niagara Purple Eagles men's basketball
Niagara Purple Eagles men's basketball